Hezingen is a hamlet in the Dutch province of Overijssel. It is a part of the municipality of Tubbergen, and lies about 15 km north of Oldenzaal.

It was first mentioned in 799 as Hasungum. In 1840, it was home to 187 people.

The hamlet is situated between Vasse and the border to Germany. Across the border it has a twin village called .

Springendal was bought in the 1920s by textile industrialist  who decorated the forest around the estate with ponds, waterfalls and little meandering streams. The nature area is nowadays publicly accessible. In 2022, a treasure of 70 golden coins and jewellery from the 7th and 8th century were discovered in Springendal.

Gallery

References

Populated places in Overijssel
Tubbergen